The End of the World is the fourth studio album by American country singer Skeeter Davis. It was released in March 1963 by RCA Victor. It includes the hit single "The End of the World", which peaked at number two on the Billboard Hot 100 pop chart.

Track listing

Credits and personnel 
 Skeeter Davis – vocals
 Anita Kerr – producer
 Chet Atkins – producer

Credits adapted from the album liner notes.

References

External links 
 [ The End of the World] at AllMusic
 

Skeeter Davis albums
1963 albums
Albums produced by Chet Atkins
RCA Records albums